The Korea Office of Civil Aviation (KOCA) is the South Korean civil aviation authority. It is subordinate to the Ministry of Land, Infrastructure and Transport (MOLIT). The head office is in the Sejong Government Complex in Sejong City. As of 2013 the Deputy Minister of the Office of Civil Aviation is Dr. Choi Jeong-ho.

History

On August 31, 1963 the Ministry of Construction and Transportation (MOCT) Aviation Bureau was formed. On August 12, 2002, the Aviation Bureau was abolished, replaced by the Civil Aviation Safety Authority. A new office for aviation was established on May 6, 2009.

See also

 Aviation and Railway Accident Investigation Board (current air and rail accident investigation agency)
 Korea Aviation Accident Investigation Board (former air accident investigation agency)
 The Korea Transport Institute (government transportation research institute)

References

External links
 Korea Office of Civil Aviation
 Flight Information Region In South Korea

Korea, South
Government agencies of South Korea
Civil aviation in South Korea
Transport organizations based in South Korea